Four Shall Die is a 1940 American supernatural crime film directed by William Beaudine. It features Dorothy Dandridge in her first credited film role.

Cast
 Niel Webster as Pierre Touissant
 Mantan Moreland as Beefus, Touissant's Chauffeur
 Laurence Criner as Roger Fielding
 Dorothy Dandridge as Helen Fielding
 Vernon McCalla as Doctor Webb
 Monte Hawley as Dr. Hugh Leonard (as Monty Hawley)
 Reginald Fenderson as Hickson (as Reggie Fenderson)
 Jack Carr as Lew Covey
 Jess Lee Brooks as Bill Summers
 Edward Thompson as Sgt. Adams

References

External links
 

1940 films
1940s crime films
American crime films
American black-and-white films
Films directed by William Beaudine
American supernatural films
1940s English-language films
1940s American films